Ammad Alam (born 3 October 1998) is a Pakistani cricketer. He made his first-class debut for United Bank Limited in the 2017–18 Quaid-e-Azam Trophy on 27 October 2017. In December 2017, he was named in Pakistan's squad for the 2018 Under-19 Cricket World Cup.

He made his List A debut for Sui Southern Gas Company in the 2018–19 Quaid-e-Azam One Day Cup on 22 September 2018.

References

External links
 

1998 births
Living people
Pakistani cricketers
Sui Southern Gas Company cricketers
United Bank Limited cricketers